Clinton is an unincorporated community in Ohio County, West Virginia, United States. It lies at an elevation of 968 feet (295 m).

Clinton bears the name of a pioneer settler.

References

Populated places in Ohio County, West Virginia
Unincorporated communities in West Virginia